Lev Taussig (born 1880 – ?) was a Czech chess master.

He took 2nd, behind Oldřich Důras, at Prague 1905 (the 1st UJCS Kongress, Czech Chess Championship), tied for 6-8th at Nuremberg 1906 (the 15th DSB Congress, Kongreß des Deutschen Schachbundes, Hauptturnier A, won by Savielly Tartakower), won at Prague 1906, took 5th at Brno 1907 (the 2nd CZE-ch, František Treybal won), took 2nd behind Duras at Prague 1907, and took 4th in the Prague 1908 chess tournament (the Main Tournament, Karel Treybal won).

References

1880 births
Czech chess players
Year of death missing
Chess players from the Austro-Hungarian Empire